Magenta is an industrial rock/alternative rock band from Norway formed by Vilde Lockert and Anders Odden during the summer of 1995.
They released their first EP, Magenta in 1997. The song "Secret Sky" entered the charts in Norway and established their career. Co-founder Anders Odden was already known in musical circles. He has been a member of bands like Cadaver and Celtic Frost. He is currently also the bassplayer for Satyricon, and guitarplayer for ORDER.

History

Early years: Initial releases and emerging popularity (1995–2003) 
The album Periode was released in March 1998, and Magenta went on tour in Norway and Germany. An EP prior to this titled Magenta was released in 1997. They signed a new record deal in April 2001 with the German label Re:pop Music. In summer 2001. They recorded the album Little Girl Lost, with the producer Vegard Ibo Blomberg. The album was released in Germany on 24 June 2002, and was very well received in the German alternative press. It reached number 4 in the German Alternative Charts during fall 2002. Magenta made a video for "All Over" featuring the band/musician Mortiis, and were surprised to find that The Coca-Cola Company wanted the song for their worldwide release of Sprite Zero. Magenta's best chart position so far has been for the CD single "All Over", which reached number 2 in the official charts in Greece on 8 July 2002, when the advertising campaign was shown there. Magenta played a number of gigs in 2002 and 2003 and then took some time off after the Arvika Festival in Sweden in 2003.

Subsequent activity: Additional studio albums (2003–2009) 
In 2006, Magenta was reinforced with the bassplayer Daniel Hill. This was very inspiring for the band and led to one of the most creative periods in the band's history. Magenta released a track with Apoptygma Berzerk called "Friendly fire" in the beginning of 2006, and this led Magenta into a serious writing process for a new album. The first new song of the new direction was "Darkest Dream".

Magenta was also strengthened by Jonas Groth who contributed to the production of the rest of the new album. Art and Accidents was released digitally in November 2008 and officially on 9 February 2009. This album was followed with a full European tour with Gothminister and Trail of Tears. Magenta was joined by the drummer, Erik Engebretsen, for this tour. With Hill now permanently on bass guitar, Magenta had for the first time in their history a stable live line up.

Odden decided to explore new grounds for Magenta and decided to write lyrics in Norwegian: the idea came to him as an epiphany on stage in London on his birthday, 20 December 2009, when he performed with Satyricon watching 1000 Englishmen sing along to "Den Siste" in Norwegian.
Magenta Aus Norwegen was recorded between September and December 2011 and was first be released as a series of digital EPs. The first single, "To Var Ett"/"Tvillingsjäl" featured guest musicians Niklas Kvarforth and Peter Huss from the Swedish black metal band, Shining

Later years: Songs for the Dead and signing to Cleopatra Records (2009–present) 
In the beginning of 2013, Magenta began recording their comeback album, Songs for the Dead, for which they have returned to their roots of dismal dark and misty music with enchanting vocals, in English.
"Songs for the Dead" was born out of a deep tragedy. The Magenta family had been invited to stay at Ministry leader, Al Jourgensen's 13th Planet Studios compound during the Xmas of 2012. They arrived the same day that Ministry guitarist Mike Scaccia left after finishing some recording. Shortly after, on 22 December, news reached them that Mike had died. Everyone at Al's compound was overwhelmed with grief. To try to get somewhat back to normal in the midst of this, they all decided to record something. Vilde and Anders' daughter, Regine, had written a song called "Ghost" in the castle of Duke Hank Von Hell (ex-Turbonegro) the Xmas before. They recorded this track with Al's magic touch and the idea for the album dedicated to those who have past on, was born.

The album is like a requiem and is a new birth for Magenta. It is the first album Magenta have done that they feel represent them fully as the kind of musical entity they want to be. In March 2015 Magenta signed to well known industrial rock label, Cleopatra Records

Members 
 Vilde Lockert – vocals
 Anders Odden – instruments & production

Live members 
 Daniel Hill – bass guitar
 Erik Engebretsen – drums

Guests on Magenta records and concerts in the past 
 Pee Jay – programming and turntables
 Elec This – programming, keyboards
 Geir Bratland – programming, keyboards
 Vegard Blomberg – programming, vocals, guitar
 Ole Bjerkebakke – drums
 Michel Langevin – drums (sampled)
 John Macaluso – drums
 Ted Skogman – drums
 Tore Ylwizaker – drums
 Håvard Bævre – drums
 Endre Tønnesen – bass guitar
 Mark Francombe – bass guitar
 Jonny Sjo – bass guitar
 Heine Aardalen – bass guitar
 Stu Manx – bass guitar
 BatKat – bass guitar
 Jonas Groth – vocals and piano
 Gothminister – vocals
 Jean-Luc De Meyer – vocals
 Computorgirl – backing vocals
 Kristoffer Rygg – vocals
 Niklas Kvarforth – vocals
 Agnete Kirkvaag – backing vocals
 Stephan Groth – backing vocals
 Lene Magica – backing vocals
 Audun Stengel (Angel) – lead guitar
 Peter Huss – lead guitar
 Andreas Bjorck – organ
 Kenneth Kannutt – turntables
 Sven Erik Kristiansen – mouth harp

Style 
Magenta is a band that likes to work without conventional genre understanding. They have used elements from various genres, including rock, pop, metal, trip hop, electro, techno, industrial, new wave, gothic, acoustic, psychedelic, trance and film music and refuse to be labeled. "Magenta is my playground where I can be as diverse and melodic as I want to," says Odden in an attempt to describe Magenta.

Discography

Full-length studio albums and EPs 
 Magenta (The Secret Sky) EP 1997 AT&MT
 Periode 1998 Tatra
 Little Girl Lost 2003 Re:pop
 Art and Accidents 2009 AT&MT
 Magenta Aus Norwegen 2012 AT&MT
 Songs For The Dead 2015 Cleopatra Records.

Singles 
 "One Mind" SGL 1998 Tatra
 "All Over" SGL 2002 Re:pop
 "Shine On" (2006)† Gun Records
 "Darkest Dream" 2008 AT&MT
 "To Var Ett"/"Tvillingsjäl" 2012 AT&MT

†Magenta made a collaboration song with Apoptygma Berzerk on their "Shine On" single named "Friendly Fire", which was also included on their 2006 Black EP.

References

External links 
 FB page
 Twitter Page

Musical groups established in 1995
Norwegian musical groups